The Coastal Carolina Chanticleers football team represents Coastal Carolina University in college football at the NCAA Division I Football Bowl Subdivision level. The Chanticleers are members of the Sun Belt Conference, fielding its teams at the FBS level since 2017. The Chanticleers play their home games at James C. Benton Field at Brooks Stadium in Conway, South Carolina.

Their head coach is Tim Beck, who was hired after head coach Jamey Chadwell was hired by Liberty.

History 

It was announced in the late 1990s that CCU would establish a football squad in the coming years. The Coastal Carolina Chanticleers football program played its inaugural season in 2003 on campus at Brooks Stadium. The team's first coach was David Bennett, who held the position from the team's inception until December 9, 2011. The university named Joe Moglia, former CEO of TD Ameritrade, as its new head coach on December 20, 2011.

In the program's short history, the team has defeated such traditional Football Championship Subdivision (FCS) powers as James Madison University (ranked No. 1 at the time), Furman University, Wofford College, and the University of Montana. The program has won seven Big South Conference championships and has had several former players enter professional NFL careers.

Coastal's primary football rivals in FCS play are Liberty and Charleston Southern.

Coastal Carolina's first full season as an FBS team was in 2017. The Chanticleers earned the program's first win as an FBS program when they played The UMass Minutemen on September 2, 2017. The final score to this game was 38-28. The Chanticleers had a tough time winning games during the 2017 season, as they went on to finish the year with a record of 3-9. Ending the 2017 season on a positive note, Coastal Carolina earned the program's first Sun Belt Conference win with a 13-7 win over the Idaho Vandals. Idaho has since left the Sun Belt Conference. The final game of the 2017 season was the program's second Sun Belt Conference win with a 28-17 win at home against the Georgia Southern Eagles. The Chanticleers first FBS season in 2017 proved that, with the proper corrections made to the team, the Chanticleers could be a good football team. Building off their momentum built at the end of the 2017 season, Coastal Carolina took the next step as an FBS program and finished the season with a record of 5-7. Some notable wins for the Chanticleers during their 2018 season were against the UAB Blazers, Louisiana Lafayette Ragin Cajuns, and Georgia State Panthers.

David Bennett era (2003–2011) 
In 2006, the Chanticleers made school history when the team received its first FCS playoff berth, also the first playoff berth for the Big South Conference, losing a first-round contest to Appalachian State. Appalachian State would go on to win the FCS national championship that season.

In 2010, Coastal went to the playoffs for the second time after winning the Big South Championship (a three-way tie with Liberty and Stony Brook) and received the Big South's first ever automatic playoff bid. The Chanticleers returned to the playoffs in 2012 and 2013. On November 9, 2014, Coastal was ranked as the No. 1 team in the nation, a first for the school and the Big South Conference.

On September 11, 2010, Coastal Carolina played a five-overtime game against the Towson Tigers, the longest game in school history. Coastal Carolina went to Towson, Maryland, looking for their first win of the season after losing the previous week to West Virginia. Coastal Carolina would lose the game 47–45.

The Chanticleers left the Big South Conference at the end of the 2015–16 school year and joined the Sun Belt Conference, initially as a non-football member. At that time, the football team began a two-year transition to the Football Bowl Subdivision (FBS). The first season of the transition in 2016 was spent as an FCS independent; the Chanticleers officially joined Sun Belt football July 1, 2017, with full bowl eligibility following in 2018.

Jamey Chadwell era (2019–present) 
Jamey Chadwell was introduced as the program's third head coach on January 18, 2019. He previously served as the team's interim head coach in 2017 when head coach Joe Moglia took a medical leave of absence.

2020 season 
On October 14, 2020, Coastal Carolina got its first win against a ranked FBS team by defeating No. 21 Louisiana 30–27. Following the win, the AP ranked Coastal Carolina No. 25, making it their first time as a national ranked team. The same week, the College Football Playoff rankings listed Coastal at No. 20. For the remainder of the regular season, Coastal remained in the AP Top 25. Their highest AP ranking that year was #14 in the fourteenth week, with a CFP ranking of No. 18 the same week. Their original opponent for Week 14 (Dec 5th) was Liberty, but Liberty canceled the game citing concerns related to the COVID-19 pandemic. Coastal’s new opponent for that week became No. 13 BYU.

The undefeated Chanticleers created national attention and interest in the team, and their matchup with BYU led ESPN to broadcast College GameDay from Conway on December 5th. Coastal won 22–17, with the game ending when BYU was stopped one yard short of the goal-line. The victory resulted in Coastal Carolina ranked No. 11 by the AP Top 25 Rankings and No. 13 by the CFP Playoffs for Week 15. With the conference championship game scheduled for December 19th, CCU was set up for another showdown with Louisiana. However, they would have to settle for a co-championship with Louisiana, with both named champions after the Chanticleers found themselves unable to play when a positive COVID-19 test was found within the CCU team.

Coastal ended their season against Liberty in the first bowl game in team history, the Cure Bowl, losing 37–34 in overtime.

2021 season 
CCU was ranked No. 22 to start the season, and won their first six games to rise up to No. 15 before a loss to Appalachian State ended the streak. They won four of their next five games but finished second in the East Division. They were invited to the 2021 Cure Bowl where CCU defeated Northern Illinois 47-41 to earn the first bowl game victory in school history.

Conference affiliations
 Big South Conference (2003–2015)
 Sun Belt Conference (2016–present)

Championships

Conference championships
Coastal Carolina has won seven Big South Conference championships, winning two of them outright and five shared, and has won one Sun Belt Conference championship which was shared with Louisiana in the 2020 season. The 2020 Sun Belt Conference Football Championship Game was not played when Coastal Carolina was unable to participate due to the COVID-19 pandemic.

† Co-champions

Division championships
Coastal Carolina won their first division championship in the 2020 season.

^ The 2020 championship game was not played due to Coastal Carolina being impacted by the COVID-19 pandemic

Postseason games

NCAA Division I FCS playoffs
Coastal Carolina made six appearances in the NCAA Division I Football Championship playoffs before moving to the NCAA Division I Football Bowl Subdivision (FBS) in 2017, going 4–6.

Bowl games
Coastal Carolina has participated in three bowl games, going 1–2.

Head coaches
Coastal Carolina has had three head coaches.

† Interim head coach in 2017 due to medical sabbatical taken by Joe Moglia.

^ Interim head coach for the 2022 Birmingham Bowll

Individual award winners

National award winners – coaches 
AP Coach of the Year
FBS National Coach of the Year
2020: Jamey Chadwell

Home Depot Coach of the Year
FBS National Coach of the Year
2020: Jamey Chadwell

Walter Camp Coach of the Year
FBS National Coach of the Year
2020: Jamey Chadwell

Eddie Robinson Coach of the Year
FBS National Coach of the Year
2020: Jamey Chadwell

George Munger Award
FBS National Coach of the Year
2020: Jamey Chadwell

Sporting News' 2020 Coach of the Year
FBS National Coach of the Year
2020: Jamey Chadwell

CBS Sports/247Sports Coach of the Year
FBS National Coach of the Year
2020: Jamey Chadwell

Paul Bear Bryant Group of 5 2020 Conference Coach of the Year
FBS National Coach of the Year
2020: Jamey Chadwell

Eddie Robinson Award
FCS National Coach of the Year
2015: Joe Moglia

 AFCA Assistant Coach of the Year
FBS National Assistant Coach of the Year
2021: Newland Isaac

Big South Conference honors 

Male Athlete of the Year
2013–14: Lorenzo Taliaferro
2014–15: Quinn Backus
Offensive Player of the Year
2004: Patrick Hall
2006: Tyler Thigpen
2013: Lorenzo Taliaferro
2014: Alex Ross
2015: De'Angelo Henderson
Defensive Player of the Year
2010: Andrae Jacobs
2012: Quinn Backus
2013: Quinn Backus
2014: Quinn Backus

Special Teams Player of the Year
2013: Ladarius Hawthorne
2015: Devin Brown
Freshman of the Year
2004: Jerome Simpson
Coach of the Year
2004: David Bennett
2010: David Bennett
2012: Joe Moglia
2014: Joe Moglia

Sun Belt Conference honors 

Player of the Year
2022: Grayson McCall
2021: Grayson McCall
2020: Grayson McCall
Defensive Player of the Year
2020: Tarron Jackson
Freshman of the Year
2022: Jared Brown
2020: Grayson McCall

Newcomer of the Year
2020: D'Jordan Strong
Coach of the Year
2020: Jamey Chadwell

Future non-conference opponents 
Announced schedules as of January 5, 2023.

References

External links

 

 

 
American football teams established in 2003
2003 establishments in South Carolina